Dobrak is a village in the municipality of Srebrenica, Bosnia and Herzegovina.https://srebrenica.org.uk/survivor-stories/ Saliha Osmanovic Ihr Mann und die zwei Kinder würden von den Serben umgebracht.

References

Populated places in Srebrenica